St. Mary of the Visitation Catholic Church is a historic church in Huntsville, Alabama and is the oldest Catholic church in North Alabama. It began construction in 1861 but was interrupted by the Civil War. The church was completed in 1877. It was listed on the National Register of Historic Places in 1980.

Description
St. Mary Church was built of limestone in a Romanesque Revival style. The façade is framed by two hexagonal towers; the spire of the north tower houses the bell, and is raised six feet (1.8 meters) above the south tower. The large central double entrance doors and smaller flanking doors are topped by an arched wooden infill panel. All openings on the façade are topped with projecting round stone arches, with the keystones and imposts projecting further. A stone belt course runs half-way up the front. Pilasters climb between the central and side doors and terminate about 5 feet (1.5 m) above the gable roof in a shallow gable wall. Crosses adorn this wall and the two towers. A semi-hexagonal apse is a later addition to the rear of the building.  The church was listed on the National Register of Historic Places in 1980.

References

Further reading

External links

National Register of Historic Places in Huntsville, Alabama
Romanesque Revival church buildings in Alabama
Churches in Huntsville, Alabama
Roman Catholic churches in Alabama
1860 establishments in Alabama
Roman Catholic churches completed in 1877
Religious organizations established in 1869
Churches on the National Register of Historic Places in Alabama
19th-century Roman Catholic church buildings in the United States